Broken Bones may refer to:
 Bone fracture
 Broken Bones (band), an English hardcore punk band
 Broken Bones (album), an album by Dokken
 The Broken Bones, a 2000 EP by MxPx
 "Broken Bones" (song), a song by Love Inc.
 "Broken Bones" (Roger Waters song), 2017
 Broken bones plant, Oroxylum indicum, a flowering plant